The 1910 Championship of Australia was an Australian rules football match that took place on 15 October 1910.

The championship was contested by the premiers of the VFL, Collingwood and the premiers of the SAFL, Port Adelaide.

The match was played at Adelaide Oval in Adelaide, South Australia.

To avoid a clash of guernsey designs Port Adelaide offered to wear its jumpers inside out resulting in an "all-black" appearance.

The match, played in front of 7,000, was won by Port Adelaide by a margin of 59 points, giving Port Adelaide its 2nd Championship of Australia Title.

Teams

Scorecard

References 

Championship of Australia
Championship of Australia
October 1910 sports events